BT Tower may refer to a number of telecommunications towers and buildings in Britain, from their connection to British Telecommunications.

Telecommunications towers
 See Telecommunications towers in the United Kingdom

Buildings
BT Tower, Birmingham
BT Tower, Cardiff (next to the Millennium Stadium)
BT Tower, London
BT Tower, Manchester
BT Tower, Swansea
Purdown BT Tower, Bristol